After All This Time may refer to:

Songs
 "After All This Time" (Rodney Crowell song)
 "After All This Time" (Simon Webbe song)
 "After All This Time", by The Beautiful Girls from Spooks
 "After All This Time", by Blaq Poet from Rewind: Deja Screw
 "After All This Time", by Carole King from Carnegie Hall Concert: June 18, 1971
 "After All This Time", by The Gordons, written by Barry and Holly Tashian
 "After All This Time", by John Hiatt from Little Head
 "After All This Time", by Kenny Rogers from They Don't Make Them Like They Used To
 "After All This Time", by Melissa Manchester from When I Look Down That Road
 "After All This Time", by Merry Clayton
 "After All This Time", by Modern Romance from Trick of the Light
 "After All This Time", by Wesley, Park & Smith, an entrant in the competition to represent the UK in the Eurovision Song Contest 1977
 "After All This Time", by Winger from Karma
 "After All This Time", from the stage musical Lestat
 "After All This Time", the theme from the UK TV series Down to Earth

Albums
 After All This Time, an album by Bonnie Koloc
 After All This Time, an album by Charley Pride
 After All This Time, an album by Jim Page and Artis
 After All This Time, an album by Mel Tillis
 After All This Time, an album by Roy Heinrich
 After All This Time: The Anthology 1972-1989, an album by B.B. Seaton

Literature
 After All This Time, a novel by Vanessa Grant